The Georgian keyboard includes several keyboard layouts for Georgian script.

Standard keyboard
Georgian standard keyboard layout was essentially that of manual typewriters. It is mostly a phonetic transliteration of the Russian JCUKEN keyboard layout, with some characters on rows two and three shifted right to accommodate additional Georgian letters, others replaced with dissimilar Georgian letters and differences in the non-letter keys, including inverted functionality of the shift key in most of the top row.

QWERTY keyboard
Georgian QWERTY keyboard layout has the Georgian letters placed similarly to corresponding Latin letters. While Georgian has no capital letters, because it has 33 letters and English has only 26, using the shift key is necessary to write Georgian, because several letters require shifting in order to be typed. QWERTY is the most popular keyboard layout writing Georgian.

Other keyboards
There is also a Georgian ergonomic keyboard layout.

References

Keyboard layouts
Georgian language
Georgian scripts
Kartvelian languages